Real Club Deportivo Carabanchel is a Spanish football club in the Carabanchel district in the city of Madrid, Spain that plays in the Tercera División RFEF – Group 7. It is the third oldest team in the capital, after Real Madrid and Atlético Madrid, and the thirteenth oldest in Spain.

The highest level the club has reached is the Segunda División B.

History
Real Club Deportivo Carabanchel was officially founded on 8 September 1906. It started playing sports teams friendlies against others in the capital city in the Alto and Bajo quarters of the district.

In 1916, Pedro Arranz became president, who gives the team a charter officers. Carabanchel also signed the same year Castellana in the Federation Cup, which began as a regional tournament. In 1927 amounts to the First Regional club, and proclaimed champion Castilla at amateur level in 1936, before the start of the Civil War.

In 1955, Carabanchel was promoted, for the first time in its history, to the Third Division to become a champion of the regional division. In season 1966–67, the Madrid team was crowned champions of their group in the Tercera earning the right to play CD Badajoz in the first play-off round, which it lost 12–1 on aggregate.

During the 1970s and 1980s the team went through various sporting crises, which were not resolved until 1988 when it returned to the third division. Carabanchel then improved, and finished in third place in the Madrid group in 1990. After several varying seasons, in 1994–95 Carabanchel qualified for the second phase of promotion to B, eventually losing to Cultural Leonesa.

Finally, in the 1995–96 season, Carabanchel were promoted to Segunda División B to finish third in regular season champion and its group for promotion. The club spent two years in the category of bronze in its first season, the team from Madrid to enter into a good season when finishing eighth, but in 1998 consume their descent to the finish next to last group.

Since then, Carabanchel fell into a deep economic crisis and sports even threatened the existence of the system: in 2006 the Third down to black and white, and without professional staff fell in 2008 he First Regional.

In the 2009–10 season, the club renewed the project with a total change of the board after a motion of censure and creating a team to climb to third division two years. After achieving promotion to the Preferente, in the 2010–11 season the club promoted to Tercera División, along with CDC Moscardó.

Among its historic rivals are Moscardó in Usera, CD Puerta Bonita in Carabanchel, and Getafe CF.

Logo

The logo represents the Cross of Saint James, pattern Carabanchel, and the Royal Crown, granted by HM Juan Carlos I of Spain in 1997 in recognition of the club's history as one of the pioneers of football in Madrid. This coat is used since then as the officer.

Kit

Real Carabanchel's kit in season 2010–2011 is a white shirt and black shorts and socks, with the sponsorship of Limpiezas Garro, Joma and Junkers. Features of the shirt are the old coat and Cross of Saint James behind the current shield. At the same time they added the player's name.

The away kit is a shirt, shorts and blue socks.
It also has a third kit of shirt, shorts and red socks.

Stadium

R.C.D. Carabanchel plays its games in the stadium known as Campo de La Mina, with a capacity for 2,000 spectators. This stadium is one of the oldest in the city. It was opened in 1916, when RCD Carabanchel obtained the official status.

Season to season

2 seasons in Segunda División B
45 seasons in Tercera División
1 season in Tercera División RFEF

References

External links
 

Association football clubs established in 1916
Football clubs in Madrid
1916 establishments in Spain
Carabanchel
Organisations based in Spain with royal patronage